The Embassy of Cambodia in Moscow is the diplomatic mission of the Kingdom of Cambodia in the Russian Federation. It is located at 16 Starokonyushenny Lane in the Khamovniki District of Moscow.

See also 
 Cambodia–Russia relations
 Diplomatic missions in Russia

References 

Cambodia–Russia relations
Cambodia
Moscow
Khamovniki District